Dorcadion albonotatum is a species of beetle in the family Cerambycidae. It was described by Pic in 1895.

References

albonotatum
Beetles described in 1895